Aleksei Anatolyevich Babenko (born 1 August 1972) is a Russian retired professional footballer.

He made his professional debut in the Soviet Second League in 1989 for FC Torpedo Naberezhnye Chelny. He played 5 games and scored 3 goals in the UEFA Intertoto Cup 1996 for FC KAMAZ-Chally Naberezhnye Chelny.

Honours
 Russian Premier League runner-up: 1998.

References

1972 births
People from Gelendzhik
Living people
Soviet footballers
Russian footballers
Russian expatriate footballers
Expatriate footballers in Kazakhstan
FC KAMAZ Naberezhnye Chelny players
Russian Premier League players
PFC CSKA Moscow players
FC Khimki players
FC Dynamo Stavropol players
FC Anzhi Makhachkala players
FC Kyzylzhar players
FC Metallurg Lipetsk players
FC Mordovia Saransk players
Association football midfielders
FC Spartak-UGP Anapa players
Sportspeople from Krasnodar Krai